Chiklu (also Romanized as Chīklū) is a village in Behdasht Rural District, Kushk-e Nar District, Parsian County, Hormozgan Province, Iran. At the 2006 census, its population was 42, in 9 families.

References 

Populated places in Parsian County